The Zachariah Barley Stone House is a historic house located at 193 Whitfield Road in Rochester, Ulster County, New York, USA.

Description and history 
It includes the house (c. 1770), hoop shop with attached modern garage (c. 1860), and smokehouse (c. 1850). The house is a -story, stone single dwelling that is rectangular in shape and built upon a linear plan. The hoop shop is a -story, heavy timer-framed building with a gabled roof. It features a massive exterior stone hearth.

It was listed on the National Register of Historic Places on August 10, 1995.

References

Houses on the National Register of Historic Places in New York (state)
Houses completed in 1770
Houses in Ulster County, New York
National Register of Historic Places in Ulster County, New York
1770 establishments in the Province of New York